The 2011 Colonial Square Ladies Classic was held from October 28 to 31 at the Nutana Curling Club in Saskatoon, Saskatchewan as part of the 2011–12 World Curling Tour. The purse for the event was CAD$35,000, and was a triple knockout format.

Teams

Results

A Event

B Event

C Event

Playoffs

References

External links

Colonial Square Ladies Classic
2011 in women's curling
Colonial Square Ladies Classic
Colonial Square Ladies Classic
Curling in Saskatoon